Sir John George Woodroffe  (15 December 1865 – 16 January 1936), also known by his pseudonym Arthur Avalon, was a British Orientalist whose extensive and complex published works on the Tantras, and other Hindu traditions, stimulated a wide-ranging interest in Hindu philosophy and yoga.

Life
Woodroffe was the eldest son of James Tisdall Woodroffe and his wife Florence, daughter of James Hume. James Woodroffe was Advocate-General of Bengal and Legal Member of the Government of India, a Justice of the Peace, and a Knight of St. Gregory. John was educated at Woburn Park School and the University College, Oxford, where he took second classes in jurisprudence and the Bachelor of Civil Law examinations. He was called to the Bar by the Inner Temple in 1889, and in the following year was enrolled as an advocate of the Calcutta High Court. He was soon made a Fellow of the Calcutta University and appointed Tagore Law Professor. He collaborated with Ameer Ali in a widely used textbook, Civil Procedure in British India. He was appointed Standing Counsel to the Government of India in 1902, and in 1904 was raised to the High Court Bench. He served there for eighteen years, becoming Chief Justice in 1915. After retiring to England he served as Reader in Indian Law to the University of Oxford. He died on 18 January 1936 in France.

Woodroffe was married to the concert pianist Ellen Elizabeth Grimson from 1902.

Sanskrit Studies
John Woodroffe's interest in tantra was sparked due to a court case, in which he felt he suddenly could not focus on the facts of the case. After mentioning this to his assistant, he was informed that a "tantrik sadhu" had been hired to perform a mantra outside the courthouse to "cloud his mind" in favor of the defendant. A constable was dispatched who chased the sadhu away. John Woodroffe said that his mind instantly cleared when the sadhu was stopped.

This event sparked a lifelong interest in tantrik and yoga studies.

Alongside his judicial duties he studied Sanskrit and Hindu philosophy and was especially interested in Hindu Tantra. He translated some twenty original Sanskrit texts and, under his pseudonym Arthur Avalon, published and lectured prolifically on Indian philosophy and a wide range of Yoga and Tantra topics. T.M.P. Mahadevan wrote: "By editing the original Sanskrit texts, as also by publishing essays on the different aspects of Shaktism, he showed that the religion and worship had a profound philosophy behind it, and that there was nothing irrational or obscurantist about the technique of worship it recommends."

John Woodroffe's sanskrit tutor and "guru" who he retained in order to study tantra, first insisted that he sleep on the floor, or he would be unable to pronounce the sanskrit properly, due to over-relaxing of the neck. He promptly had his bed removed, and replaced it with a thin mat.

John Woodroffe's sanskrit studies led him to become even more precise in his sanskrit than most native speakers, leaving him in a position to translate the most difficult sanskrit texts.

Woodroffe was initiated into a yoga lineage similar to that of Lahiri Mahasay, now publicized as kriya yoga.

Woodroffe was believed by his "guru" to be the reincarnation of two somewhat famous persons from Indian history.

His choice of the name Arthur Avalon was due his initiation into the western equivalent of eastern tantra, the secretive Celtic religion which worships in secret within many British Churches, which has Arthur, with the nine sisters of Avalon in place of the ten incarnations of Vishnu, the nine incarnations of Durga, or the ten Mahavidyas as within other tantrik systems.

Mahānirvāṇatantraṃ
Woodroffe translated the Mahānirvāṇatantraṃ from the original Sanskrit into English under his pen name, Arthur Avalon: a play on the magical realm of Avalon and the young later-to-be, King Arthur, within the story-cycle of tales known generally as King Arthur and the Knights of the Round Table; specifically according to Taylor (2001: p. 148), Woodroffe chose the name from the noted incomplete magnum opus, the painting 'Arthur's Sleep in Avalon' by Burne-Jones. Moreover, Taylor (2001: p. 148) conveys the salience of this magical literary identity and contextualises by making reference to western esotericism, Holy grail, quest, occult secrets, initiations and the Theosophists:
"This is quite important to know, for here we have a writer on an Indian esoteric system taking a name imbued with western esotericism. The name at any rate seems to hint at initiations and the possession of occult secrets. The Arthurian legends are bound up with the story of the Holy Grail and its quest. This was a symbol of esoteric wisdom, especially to Theosophists who appropriated the legend. Anyone who named himself after King Arthur or the mystic isle of Avalon would be thought to be identifying himself with occultism, in Theosophists' eyes."

Bibliography
His writings (published under his own name, as well as Arthur Avalon) include:

 Introduction to the Tantra Śāstra,  (1913).
 Tantra of the Great Liberation (Mahānirvāna Tantra),  (1913).
 Hymns to the Goddess (1913).
Shakti and Shâkta,  (1918).
 The Serpent Power,  (1919).

 The World as Power,  (1922).
 The Garland of Letters.  (1922).
 Principles of Tantra (2 vols) .
 Kularnava Tantra (Introduction by John Woodroffe).  (1965).
 Kamakalavilasa by Puṇyānanda.
 Bharati Shakti: Essays and Addresses on Indian Culture.
 India: Culture and Society.
 Is India Civilized? Essays on Indian Culture.

Arms

See also
Kali
Mantra
Yantra

References

Further reading
 Shakti and Shakta, by John Woodroffe, Published by Forgotten Books, 1910. .
 Hymn to Kali:Karpuradi Stotra, by Sir John Woodroffe. Published by Forgotten Books. 1922. .
 Hymns to the Goddess, Translated by John George Woodroffe, Ellen Elizabeth (Grimson) Woodroffe, Published by Forgotten Books, 1952 (org 1913). .
 Mahanirvana Tantra, By Arthur Avalon, 1913,.
 Sir John Woodroffe, Tantra And Bengal- An Indian Soul In A European Body?, by Kathleen Taylor. Routledge, 2001, .

External links

 Sir John Woodroffe's representations of Hindu Tantra Colorado University
 Woodroffe
 Works of sir John Woodroffe Sacred texts''

1865 births
1936 deaths
English orientalists
English Indologists
English Hindus
British India judges
English non-fiction writers
20th-century English judges
Knights Bachelor
Alumni of University College, Oxford
Legal scholars of the University of Oxford
Converts to Hinduism
English male non-fiction writers
Yoga scholars